Violent Naples is a 1976 poliziottesco film directed by Umberto Lenzi. It starred Maurizio Merli, John Saxon and Barry Sullivan, and was the first sequel to Violent Rome and the second entry into the Commissioner Betti Trilogy. Saxon appeared in several such movies.

Plot
Commissioner Betti (Maurizio Merli) is transferred to Naples, receiving on his arrival a warm welcome from The Commandante (Barry Sullivan), the city's crime lord. Betti goes on a personal mission against corruption and organized crime, trying to force the syndicate out of town by any means necessary.

Cast
 Maurizio Merli: Commissioner Betti
 John Saxon: Francesco Capuano
 Barry Sullivan: camorra boss 'O Generale
 Elio Zamuto: Franco Casagrande
 Silvano Tranquilli: Paolo Gervasi
 Maria Grazia Spina: Gervasi's wife
 Guido Alberti: Superintendent
 Tom Felleghy: Commissioner in Genoa

Release
Violent Naples was released in Italy on 7 August 1976, where it was distributed by Fida Cinematografica. It had a domestic gross of 2,046,936,220 Italian lire. In the United Kingdom the film was released as Sudden Justice. The film was followed by Special Cop in Action, the final film in the Commissioner Betti trilogy.

Reception
The Monthly Film Bulletin described the film as a "nasty, brutish and over-long escapade" that was plagiarizing Dirty Harry. The review found the film to be "lacklustre in style, without a trace of tension to its slam-bang action".

See also 
 List of Italian films of 1976

Notes

References

External links

1976 films
1970s Italian-language films
1970s crime films
Poliziotteschi films
Films about the Camorra
Films set in Naples
Films directed by Umberto Lenzi
Films scored by Franco Micalizzi
1970s Italian films